Aleksandr Viktorovich "Alex" Miroshnichenko (26 April 1964 – 19 May 2003) was an ethnic Russian Kazakhstani professional boxer. As an amateur he represented the Soviet Union at the 1988 Summer Olympics, winning a bronze medal in the super-heavyweight division.

His other accomplishments included silver at the 1989 World Championships, as well as bronze at the 1983 and 1989 European Championships, and other international tournaments.

Early years
Miroshnichenko took up boxing at the age of 13, at the strong insistence of his mother, who thought that her son must be able to defend himself, and brought him to the gym at his hometown of Kostanay. Miroshnichenko shown little interest in boxing, but had a natural talent and considerable ability to compete both nationally and internationally, which he did during the 1980s. He was ranked world's #6 super heavyweight by the AIBA in 1984.

Amateur career

Aside from his Olympic performance, Miroshnichenko had a distinguished amateur career, winning 210 out of 233 bouts, including a win over future world heavyweight champion Lennox Lewis and 1984 U.S. Army and inter-service champion Wesley Watson. He won medals in the European Championships and the World Cup, and was a three-time Soviet champion. He represented the Dynamo Sports Society. At the 1988 Olympics semifinals Miroshnichenko floored U.S. Riddick Bowe momentarily in the first round, but Bowe managed to win by the decision. Despite Miroshnichenko's loss to Bowe, Lou Falcigno, a New York-based boxing promoter of Momentum Enterprises, Inc., expressed a particular interest in bringing him to the United States to fight professionally. Negotiations began between the promoter and the Soviet Boxing Federation and Sovintersport, the entity responsible for the commercialization of Soviet sports, but proven unsuccessful as the Soviet government dismissed the idea early in 1989.

Highlights

 President's Cup, Jakarta, Indonesia, February 1982:
Finals: Lost to Francesco Damiani (Italy)
 Friendship Tournament, Usti nad Labem, Czechoslovakia, July 1982:
1/2: Defeated Bohumil Hruška (Czechoslovakia) KO 1
Finals: Lost to Sven Karberg (East Germany) by walkover
 European Championships, Varna, Bulgaria, May 1983:
1/4: Defeated Olaf Mayer (Austria) by unanimous decision, 5–0
1/2: Lost to Ulli Kaden (East Germany) by unanimous decision, 0–5
 World Cup, Rome, Italy, October 1983:
1/2: Lost to Craig Payne (United States) by unanimous decision, 0–5
 Giraldo Córdova Cardín, Ciego de Ávila, Cuba, June 1985:
1/2: Defeated Roberto Gómez (Cuba)
Finals: Lost to Jorge Luis González (Cuba) RSC 3
 Goodwill Games, Moscow, Soviet Union, July 1986:
1/2: Defeated Ali Al-Baluchi (Kuwait) by unanimous decision, 5–0
Finals: Lost to Vyacheslav Yakovlev (Soviet Union) by majority decision, 1–4
USA−USSR Middle & Heavy Duals, ARCO Arena, Sacramento, California, July 1986:
Defeated Wesley Watson (United States) KO 1 
USA−USSR Exhibition, Houston, Texas, August 1986:
Defeated Troy Baudoin (United States) RSC 2 
 InterCup, Hemsbach, West Germany, April 1987:
Finals: Lost to Janusz Zarenkiewicz (Poland) DQ 2
USA−USSR Heavy Duals, University of South Florida, Tampa, Florida, June 1987:
Defeated George Kilbert Pierce (United States) by unanimous decision, 3–0
 Socialist Countries Police Championships, Pyongyang, North Korea, August 1987:
Finals: Defeated Peter Hrivňák (Czechoslovakia) RET 1

 TSC Tournament, Werner-Seelenbinder-Halle, Berlin, East Germany, September 1987:
1/4: Defeated Lino Pairol (Cuba)
1/2: Defeated István Szikora (Hungary) RET 3
Finals: Lost to Ulli Kaden by unanimous decision, 0–5
 InterCup, Karlsruhe, West Germany, April 1988:
Finals: Defeated Lennox Lewis (Canada) by unanimous decision, 5–0
Olympic SuperHeavy qualifications, Karlsruhe, West Germany, April 1988:
1/4: Defeated István Szikora (Hungary) by decision
1/2: Defeated Azis Salihu (Yugoslavia)
Finals: Defeated Janusz Zarenkiewicz (Poland) by walkover
Pre-Olympic Tournament, Seoul, South Korea, March 1988:
Defeated Ulli Kaden (East Germany) by split decision, 3–2
USSR−USA Duals, Moscow, Soviet Union, 1988:
Defeated Riddick Bowe (United States) by decision
 Summer Olympics, Seoul, South Korea, September 1988:
1/8: Defeated Ali Al-Baluchi (Kuwait) by unanimous decision, 5–0
1/4: Defeated Kim Yoo-Hyun (South Korea) by unanimous decision, 5–0
1/2: Lost to Riddick Bowe (United States) by unanimous decision, 0–5 
 European Championships, Athens, Greece, May 1989:
1/8: Defeated Pekka Viippo (Finland) KO 1
1/4: Defeated Janusz Zarenkiewicz (Poland) KO 2
1/2: Lost to Ulli Kaden (East Germany) by majority decision, 1–4
 World Championships, Moscow, Soviet Union, September–October 1989:
1/4: Defeated Andreas Schnieders (West Germany) RSCH 2
1/2: Defeated Ladislav Husarik (Czechoslovakia) on points, 19–5
Finals: Lost to Roberto Balado (Cuba) on points, 9–18 

He had 233 fights as an amateur, finishing his amateur career with a record of 210–23.

Professional career
Miroshnichenko turned pro in 1990, at the very advent of professional boxing in the late Soviet Union, and had limited success. He began his career by knocking out Roberto Servin in the first round. In Miroshnichenko's third fight, he stopped future WBC International Champion, Ross Puritty.

In 1991, Miroshnichenko won the vacant Russian Heavyweight title from Nurlan Dzhanibekov. After vacating the Russian title in 1992, Miroshnichenko won a very close Split Decision against Samuel M'Bendjob by only one point. In 1993, Miroshnichenko beat former IBF Cruiserweight Champion, Ricky Parkey in an impressive third round Knockout.

After 21 consecutive wins against limited competition, Miroshnichenko was finally defeated by Oleg Maskaev in 1993 in Maskaev's first pro fight: a TKO in the third round. Miroshnichenko's cornermen later told that he entered the bout with his arm fractured. Miroshnichenko retired after the bout.

Retirement and later years
Upon his retirement from competition, he opened a state-sponsored boxing school for youth, and worked as a chief boxing coach of the Kostanay Region in 2000-2002. He also helped to establish the school of martial arts at the Kostanay State University (the only martial arts higher education unit in Kazakhstan,) which he headed as a dean until his death.

Death
Miroshnichenko died under unclear circumstances in 2003, age 39, after supposedly falling down nine flights of stairs at his apartment building in his hometown. Rumours initially circulated that his death was related to his testimony in the trial of a local judge, but local prosecutor's office later ruled his death was most probably accidental, and case was closed.

Professional boxing record

Memory
Alexandr Miroshnichenko Memorial annual junior boxing tournament has been established in his hometown of Kostanay.

References

External links
 Amateur Record
  (history)
 Один из первых наших профи (in Russian) at Sports.kz

1964 births
2003 deaths
People from Kostanay
Accidental deaths from falls
Soviet male boxers
Heavyweight boxers
Boxers at the 1988 Summer Olympics
Olympic boxers of the Soviet Union
Olympic bronze medalists for the Soviet Union
Accidental deaths in Kazakhstan
Olympic medalists in boxing
Kazakhstani people of Ukrainian descent
Kazakhstani male boxers
AIBA World Boxing Championships medalists
Medalists at the 1988 Summer Olympics
Goodwill Games medalists in boxing
Competitors at the 1986 Goodwill Games